Biddle Memorial Hall is a historic building located on the campus of Johnson C. Smith University in Charlotte, Mecklenburg County, North Carolina.  It was built in 1883, and is a 3 1/2-story, five bay Romanesque style brick and stone building on a raised basement.  It features an elaborate clock tower with a pyramidal slate roof and baritizans at each corner.  It was built as the main building for the school established in 1867 by the Presbyterian church for the education of African-American students.  It was named in 1923 to honor Mary D. Biddle who donated $1,400 to the school.

It was listed on the National Register of Historic Places in 1975.

References

External links 

Biddle Hall info

Clock towers in North Carolina
Johnson C. Smith University
African-American history in Charlotte, North Carolina
University and college buildings on the National Register of Historic Places in North Carolina
School buildings completed in 1883
Buildings and structures in Charlotte, North Carolina
National Register of Historic Places in Mecklenburg County, North Carolina